Detective Mac Taylor is a fictional character and the co-protagonist of the CBS crime drama CSI: NY. Portrayed by Gary Sinise, Mac is the Director of the NYPD Crime Lab and the Supervisor of the NYPD CSI team. Mac appeared in 200 episodes of the CSI franchise.

Background and family 
Born McKenna Llewellyn Taylor, Mac is the son of McKenna Boyd Taylor and Millie (maiden name unknown). The elder Taylor served in the United States Army during World War II as a member of the 6th Armored Division, which liberated the concentration camp Buchenwald. In a taped interview, an elderly Holocaust survivor recounts how Mac's father, then a young Private, restored his dignity and even offered him a candy bar.

After being demobilized, Mac's father worked as a mechanic in the South Side of Chicago, where Mac was raised. In the final episode of season 8 Mac was revealed to have Welsh heritage, and has the middle name Llewellyn.

Mac's father died of small-cell lung cancer and spent the last eight months of his life in bed on a feeding tube. As a result, Mac has come to believe strongly in a person's right to a dignified death. However, when his father begged him to pull the plug, Mac couldn't do it.

Mac was married to New York City native Claire Conrad. They married not long before Mac's father died, presumably during the late 1980s and the couple had no children, though Claire had a child named Reed Garrett from a previous relationship, whom she had since put up for adoption. Mac once described Claire as 5'6", athletic, with light brown hair and big blue eyes. Claire was killed in the September 11 attacks and her death troubles and pains him to this day, causing chronic insomnia. After her death, Mac got rid of everything that reminded him of her, except pictures and a beach ball she had blown up, saying, "Her breath is still in there." Her remains were never recovered from the debris of the World Trade Center.

Military service 
It was stated that Mac greatly admired his father and was influenced to join the military and go into law enforcement by him. He once said that he had wanted to serve his country more than anything else in the world. Even as a child, he dressed up in fatigues and pretended to be a soldier rather than a superhero.

Mac followed in his father's footsteps into the military and served in the United States Marine Corps. He was a Lieutenant in the 1st Battalion 8th Marines during the peacekeeping mission to Beirut, Lebanon. In Season 6 it was mentioned that he served in the Gulf War and he is shown wearing the Southwest Asia Service Medal, although he himself has never spoken of the deployment. His decorations include the Silver Star, Bronze Star, Purple Heart, Navy & Marine Corps Commendation Medal and Navy & Marine Corps Achievement Medal. He was discharged in March 1992 at Camp Lejeune.

While serving in Beirut Mac was injured in the 1983 Beirut barracks bombing, from which he still bears a scar over his heart. It is revealed in flashbacks that he had tried but was unable to save a young Marine, Corporal Stan Whitney, who was fatally wounded and the memory still occasionally haunts him, as seen when he had to stabilize a critically injured Don Flack after an explosion in Season 2.

Prior to his father's death, Mac had considered retiring from the Marine Corps to "settle down" and received a job offer from NYPD. He told his father he intended to turn it down and move back to Chicago to be nearer to him but his father encouraged him to take up NYPD's offer since Claire was from New York City.

Details of Mac's military service are sketchy as he has rarely discussed his past to his colleagues but it has been implied that Mac had a distinguished and decorated career as a Marine. There are conflicting details about the rank at which he was discharged as his DD Form 214, as shown in the Season 2 finale, states that he was a Sergeant. In the same episode he stated that he was Lieutenant while serving in Beirut and in Season 6, in a flashback, he is shown to be a Major.

Thanks to his Marine training, he is skilled in unarmed hand-to-hand combat and seems to have an intimate knowledge of a wide range of weaponry, from bows through East Asian weaponry to the more everyday guns and knives. To Mac, the type of weapon used is as revealing as anything else at the scene of the crime.

Mac holds members of the armed forces and law enforcement officers in high esteem and to an even higher standard. He considers a uniform a "badge of honor". As Detective Don Flack once said of him, "Once a Marine, always a Marine".

After being discharged from the Marine Corps, Mac moved to New York City and joined the New York City Police Department. Since then he has called New York home. He once told a colleague that they were working for the "finest city in the finest country in the world".

Awards and decorations
The following are the medals and service awards fictionally worn by Major Taylor.

In addition, Major Taylor is a recipient of the Marine Corps Expert Rifle Badge and the Marine Corps Expert Pistol Badge.

Characterization 
Throughout the series, Mac has shown that he will protect three things at any cost: The honor of his country (through his military service), the safety of his city (through his work at CSI), and the integrity of his lab (by suspending or firing workers who fail to abide by the rules). Strict but fair with his colleagues, his "follow the book" approach, perhaps due to his military background, has sometimes put him in conflict with those working under him, as shown in instances where he was forced to take disciplinary actions against Danny, Sheldon, Stella and Adam for going against protocol, but also trusts his team and has repeatedly defended them from unfair criticism by the bureaucracy.

Mac is portrayed as a workaholic and is frequently seen working late into the night, after all the staff and his team have gone home. It is partly due to his insomnia and also his desire and dedication to bring criminals to justice.

Mac believes that committing a crime is never justifiable regardless of the circumstances. This was especially evident in the Season 6 episode "Blacklist" when the murderer, who was dying of lung cancer and murdered the healthcare professionals he felt were responsible for his condition, attempted to gain Mac's sympathy by mentioning Mac's father, who died of small-cell lung cancer. Mac refuses and retorts at the suspect, telling him "If you have a message, write your congressman."

Mac believes in following the evidence, not trusting to intuition. He looks at a crime scene (and often the world) with Veneziano's theory of quantum physics in mind: Everything is connected. In Mac's mind, if he and his team can just figure out the connections, then they can solve the crime. Only once does he state otherwise, when he and Lindsay Monroe are called to a corpse sitting on a Central Park bench, whose death at first seems inexplicable to Lindsay. Mac proceeds to show his cause of death by saying, "Don't quote me on this, Lindsay, but sometimes...[lifts the man's severed head] not everything's connected."

While Mac typically displays a somber and serious demeanor, he does have a lighter side; he teases Sheldon Hawkes in episode 2.02 "Grand Murder at Central Station", by telling the young CSI, who is taking a quick lunch break, that "eating is frowned upon", and when Hawkes asks to borrow a little girl's teddy bear(Franklin) because he may have evidence on him, Mac jokes "So did Franklin tell you anything, or did he lawyer up?". Later in Season 2, Lindsay Monroe discovers that he plays bass guitar in a jazz club when he is off-duty. Mac also is shown playing bass in the episode 4.04 "Time's Up", after receiving a goodbye letter from Peyton.

Relationships

Romantic

Towards the end of the 6th season Mac commences a relationship with ER Doctor and Air Force Reservist Aubrey Hunter played by Mädchen Amick, who when visiting the NYPD crime lab was impressed when she found out that Mac had served in the US Marine Corps. However, she did not feature in the 7th season. Mac first meets Aubrey in his local Deli.

With other NYPD staff
In dealing with the younger members of his team, Mac is strict and does not hesitate to suspend them if they are found to be in a conflict of interest or becoming too emotionally attached to a case, such as when Aiden Burn was pursuing the DJ Pratt rape case and when Hawkes did not report a personal conflict of interest when his ex-girlfriend was a subject in one of Mac's investigations.

Mac had a close friendship with fellow detective Stella Bonasera and was suitably concerned when she was held hostage in her own apartment by her deranged boyfriend, Frankie Mala, in 2.21 "All Access" and eventually forced to kill him. After she is discharged from the hospital, he "orders" her to take some time off and get counseling before coming back to work. He once tells Stella he wouldn't do this job without her. The two exchange Christmas and birthday presents, and because of this, Stella is mistaken to be Claire Conrad by Reed Garrett when she leaves Mac's home after giving him his birthday present.  Mac is also the first person Stella tells about the possibility that she may be infected with HIV (episode 3.17, "The Ride In"). She also informs the press that there is no one inside or outside her profession that she trusts more than Mac Taylor.

Danny Messer has developed a deep trust in him. In Season 2 the team began investigating an old murder case after remains dating over a decade ago were found in a football field and tied to a street gang Danny and his older brother Louie once ran with when Danny was a youngster. Danny denies having any connection with the remains and Mac displays his trust in him by telling him "I believe you". Louie is later beaten up as retribution and Mac is the first person Danny confides in. Danny, however, is the last to find out about the romance between Mac and Peyton (episode 3.16, "Heart of Glass"). Mac was a witness at Danny's marriage ceremony to Lindsay Monroe and the godfather of their daughter Lucy.

In season three, he is revealed to have been dating Dr. Peyton Driscoll, one of the medical examiners. His relationship with Peyton has not been easy; his insistence that they keep their relationship under wraps at the lab conflicts with her desire to be less secretive about them. A particularly tense moment occurs during episode 3.11 "Raising Shane" when, during a debate about the state of their relationship, Mac accidentally calls Peyton "Claire", which causes her to walk out on him (somewhat ironic in light of Peyton being played by actress Claire Forlani). The two reconcile with a hug in the lab in the next episode (3.12 "Silent Night"). Later, by episode 3.16 "Heart of Glass", Mac and Peyton have evidently openly acknowledged their relationship, when they show up together at a crime scene on Mac's day off because Peyton is on call as the Medical Examiner.  Danny Messer, who has already arrived on scene as the CSI, says he thought Mac had the day off.  Mac confirms this, but says that Peyton was on call & he is with her.  Danny then asks Mac, "So am I the last one to hear about this?"  To which Mac replies, "I guess so".  Danny asks if Don Flack knows, and Mac confirms that he does.  This seems to indicate that Danny is indeed the last to know about the relationship, and no one at the lab has expressed any reservations about it. In 3.24 "Snow Day", Peyton invited Mac to go with her to England while she's there for a medical examiners conference. She wants him to use ten days of the seven weeks of vacation time he has accumulated. At first Mac is uncertain if he wants to go, but after the events in the episode take place, he informs his teammates that he is going to England with Peyton. However, Mac returns to New York without Peyton at the start of season 4, and at the end of the 4th episode, "Time's Up", he receives a letter from her saying that she has decided to stay in London with her family and that a long-distance relationship would never work, because "however close we may be, there would always be an ocean between us." Mac seeks solace in his bass guitar in a jazz bar.

Mac's relationship with former M.E. and junior CSI Sheldon Hawkes is amicable for the first two seasons. However, in episode 3.07 "Murder Sings the Blues", Hawkes tries to make sure he stays on a case by not informing Mac of his relationship to the victim in one of their cases; however, Mac feels betrayed when Peyton inadvertently reveals Hawkes' secret, and Mac dresses him down in front of the entire lab and pulls him from the case. They reconciled in episode 3.09 "Here's To You, Mrs. Azrael", when Mac confides to Hawkes about his father's final agonizing months dying from cancer. When Hawkes is falsely accused in a robbery-homicide, Mac puts his career on the line to help his friend, locking himself in the interrogation room with Sheldon to question him, even though his team had been removed from the case (episode 3.11 "Raising Shane").

Mac and NYPD Detective Don Flack share a deep mutual respect and friendship, despite their very different temperaments. This trust becomes strained when Mac discovers that one of Flack's detectives is dirty. Mac asks for Flack's memo book to determine which officer was the culprit. Despite Flack's unwillingness to believe that one of his men is corrupt, he eventually capitulates and turns over the notebook. Their relationship remains tense for several episodes until they confront the issue in episode 3.10 "Sweet 16". When Mac locks himself in the interrogation room to talk freely with wrongly-accused Sheldon Hawkes, Flack defends Mac to his Captain, saying that they'd do the same for each other (episode 3.11 "Raising Shane"). Flack and Mac argue again briefly when a serial killer is released from prison thanks to the aforementioned arrest of the detective, but they quickly put aside their differences to catch the murderer and put him away for good (episode 3.21 "Past Imperfect").

Outside the lab
During the final episode of the first season Mac is seen talking to a woman who later asks him for a drink, she meets him again and the episode ends.

In the first half of season 3, Mac met Reed Garrett, the child that Claire relinquished for adoption before she met Mac. They met when Mac caught him following Stella, who Reed mistakenly believed to be his mother. Mac offers him his business card and asks for a chance to get to know him, but is initially turned down. In spite of Reed's reluctance to keep in touch with Mac, Mac still reaches out to him. At Thanksgiving, Mac visits Reed at his adoptive parents' home and gives him photos of Claire. (The pictures of Claire are actually given to Reed when Mac has invited him for burgers and gets a call, Mac asks Reed to "hold on to these for me.") Later, Reed turns to Mac after the young man is brutally beaten because of an article he is writing for the college newspaper.

During season 4 we discover that Reed has become a blogger and has a very popular column. He visits and calls Mac often wanting the latest scoop on the "Cabbie Killer." Mac refuses to give him information that has not been released, but promises to give him the first crack at the story when it is appropriate. At the end of "Like Water For Murder", Mac allows Reed to come to the latest crime scene of the Cabbie Killer.

In episode 4.20 "Taxi", Mac becomes upset when he learns that Reed has a source close to the Cabbie Killer and won't divulge it. When Mac goes to talk to him about his source, he finds Reed's backpack on the floor of his apartment hallway, and his keys still in the lock. Back at the lab, he realizes that Reed has been kidnapped by his source—the Cabbie Killer himself. Mac is extremely worried for his stepson's life. Through posts on Reed's blog, the team is able to locate the Cabbie Killer and the now injured Reed. Mac stays with Reed at the hospital, and after catching the Cabbie Killer, takes him home.

In the line of duty
Mac's badge number is 8433. An NYPD Medal for Valor certificate is seen framed and mounted in his office in the season 6 episode "Rest in Peace, Marina Garito".

Mac keeps a pile of unsolved cases on the corner of his desk. Rapist/murderer DJ Pratt's file remained there for some time, until the CSIs closed it with the posthumous assistance of former colleague Aiden Burn. Mac says the pile used to be bigger, which helps validate his feelings about being a CSI. He usually sacrifices his off-days when cracking a cold case or an urgent case (episode 3.16 "Heart of Glass"). Flack commented in episode 5.23 "Greater Good" that Mac "must've been the kid who did all the extra credit questions and made us all look bad" after seeing him at work on an off day. In episode 1.01 "Blink" Stella expressed her concern about Mac after finding out that he skipped his off hours and dived right into the new murder case.

When Miami CSI Lieutenant Horatio Caine comes to New York in pursuit of a murder suspect, Mac and his team help him discover the real killer and apprehend him (CSI: Miami episode 2.23 "MIA/NYC Nonstop"). Mac later flies down to Miami to assist Caine in recapturing escaped murderer Henry Darius, who eventually heads back to New York. He meets Horatio's CSI Assistant Calleigh Duquesne. Together, the CSI detectives (Horatio and Mac) successfully apprehend Darius and extradite him to Florida (CSI: Miami episode 4.07 "Felony Flight", CSI: NY episode 2.07 "Manhattan Manhunt").

In one episode, Mac and Flack are caught in a bomb blast in a building while trying to evacuate it. Though he himself is wounded in the neck, Mac is able to stabilize a critically injured Flack long enough for help to arrive, thanks to his previous traumatic experience in the Beirut barracks bombing. Mac and his team discover the NYC bomber to be a schizophrenic would-be Marine out to prove the vulnerability of the city to terrorist attack. By appealing to the man's sense of military duty, Mac is able to get him to surrender. The detective privately acknowledges to Stella that, while the bomber's methods may have been flawed, Mac could not argue against the principle of protecting his city and country. After the resolution of the crisis, Mac and the other CSIs stay by Flack's hospital bedside in shifts until he recovers.

Mac and Flack are also instrumental in ending a hostage situation involving a deaf young man holding his baby daughter and his murdered girlfriend's mother at gunpoint in their car. While Mac talks to the young man, Flack sneaks up on the other side of the car and slips the baby out of the vehicle through the driver's side window. As soon as the child is secure, Mac is able to safely disarm the young man without anyone getting injured. The baby is then returned to the custody of her grateful grandparents (episode 3.12 "Silent Night").

One of Mac's most difficult situations on the job involves the discovery of Aiden Burn's questionable behavior. Aiden had been sorely tempted to tamper with evidence in order to implicate a rape suspect whose victim decided to press charges against him after he raped her a second time (the victim declined to press charges after the first assault). Though Aiden eventually does not follow through, she had broken the seal on the evidence, and Mac, insistent on preserving the integrity of the lab, felt that his only option was to fire her. Nevertheless, he promises Aiden that he will bring the rapist to justice, a promise that he makes good on (with Aiden's help in a sad irony) in episode 2.23 "Heroes."

A serial killer, Clay Dobson, whom Mac helped put away five years previously, comes back to haunt him after the man is released, thanks to Mac's arrest of the detective (Dean Truby) who took his confession. Mac's single-minded intensity in his renewed pursuit of this killer makes him short-tempered with his concerned coworkers. After the CSIs discover one of Dobson's victims is still alive, Mac charges after him, alone, cornering him on a roof of a tall building. Dobson comes crashing to earth moments later, fatally impacting on the hood of a police cruiser, only feet away from Flack and some uniformed officers arriving as backup. His hands are cuffed, and Mac gazes down from the roof in horror (episode 3.21 "Past Imperfect"). Flashbacks in the following episode reveal that Dobson intentionally fell from the roof, telling Mac that if he went down, he would take the detective with him. The Chief of Detectives, Brigham Sinclair, in a bid to remove Mac from his position at the lab (for political reasons, as Mac believes), initiates an Internal Affairs investigation, even though the district attorney did not find enough evidence to charge Mac (episode 3.22 "Cold Reveal"). During the hearing, the prosecutor appears to be determined to destroy Mac's career, despite attempts by his colleagues to aid him in their testimony. Former Detective Truby calls Taylor from jail, desiring to meet him in person. During the visit, Truby, guilty over Dobson's release, offers Mac a trump card to play against Deputy Inspector Gerrard and Sinclair: When Dobson had originally been arrested several years previously, Gerrard, then a lieutenant, failed to remove Dobson's belt. Dobson used the belt in a suicide attempt in his cell. Gerrard and Sinclair, the precinct captain, covered up the suicide attempt as well as Gerrard's lapse in procedure. Mac confronts the two and threatens to take his evidence to the media, thereby ruining both their political aspirations. Sinclair decides to have Mac cleared of all charges and the Internal Affairs investigation discontinued, and Mac remains quiet about his knowledge.

During his trip to England, Mac seems to be stalked by person or persons unknown; he starts receiving anonymous phone calls (most of which are silent, though some are very short messages from an unidentified caller) from a phone extension of 333 at 3:33 am; the calls continue after he gets back to New York. It appears that whoever is stalking Mac seems to know him intimately, as the calls keep coming despite him transferring to another hotel and changing his cell phone number.

During 4.09 "One Wedding and a Funeral", Mac discovers, that the 333 caller has been stalking him for some time, and at the end, a three-dimensional puzzle of his first case and first apartment in NYC leads him to where he got engaged in NYC. There he finds another puzzle with a stone leading him to a building back in Chicago. Mac also tests the puzzle pieces and the T-shirt and sees that whoever handled the puzzle was the brother of the T-shirt's owner. Mac flies to Chicago and the building from the puzzle. The episode ends with the 333 caller saying to him "How does it feel to be home, Detective Taylor?"

In 4.10 "The Thing About Heroes...", Mac continues his Chicago investigation and follows the clues to a body hanging in an unused floor of the Chicago Tribune building. A hangman puzzle written on the wall leaves out the letters that spell "Coward". The decomposed body is revealed to be that of Bobby Toole who died thirty years ago. Mac goes and talks to a former friend of his named Jimmy. He asks Jimmy if he's the stalker and if it's because of his brother Will's death. Mac has proof the bloody T-shirt is Will's and says they were the only ones who knew that Bobby Toole killed Will and that they killed Bobby. Jimmy is incensed at the idea and that Mac is acting high and mighty after he apparently let Will down that night. Jimmy says Mac has no idea what it was like seeing his father cry and lying to his younger brother Andy about Will's death. Then Jimmy storms away. Mac turns around to see Flack standing there. Since an attempt was made on the team's life while Mac was away, and the chief had been getting angry calls about Mac's work from Chicago police, Don has been sent to help Mac clean things up quickly. Mac tells Flack when he and Jimmy were both 14 they used to tag along with Jimmy's brother Will (age 16) to make deliveries for a guy named Sal Marchetti. One night, they delivered money to Bobby Toole, but Toole got upset that it wasn't all there. He began to beat Will. Jimmy grabbed Bobby's gun but was hit and dropped it. Jimmy yelled for Mac to get the gun and he did but Mac couldn't bring himself to pull the trigger. Jimmy grabbed the gun from Mac and shot and killed Toole. They took Will to the ER where he died and told the police they were mugged, but they didn't see by who. They then told Sal what happened and Sal told them he would help hide the evidence.

They never spoke of what happened again. Flack tells Mac it was self-defense, but Mac points out they were too young to know the difference. Mac compares DNA evidence from a cigarette butt of Jimmy's he took when they spoke to the puzzle pieces and the bloody T-shirt and doesn't find a match, thus proving that Andy must be the brother involved. This confuses Mac, since Andy wasn't present when it happened. Stella looks through the evidence again and discovers something odd. The unused Chicago puzzle pieces had blue place markers on them, and the NYC pieces had green markers. When she left a piece of the NYC puzzle at a man named Drew Bedford's work, she went back for it, but she actually had picked up a piece of the Chicago puzzle, which she wouldn't have had yet. Drew (Andrew) is revealed to be Andy, and he has been attempting to woo Stella in an attempt to get closer to Mac. Taylor and Flack race back to the city so they can assist in his capture. During a sweep of his office though, Andy hits Mac over the head and drags him off down a secret tunnel. The CSI team rushes back to the lab where they find that an MP3 player that had been rigged to control a murder scene/subway train earlier, in an attempt to kill them, has a song left on it. The song is called "Train to Nowhere", and is track 6 on an album. This points to the abandoned City Hall # line station. They realize that Andy leaving obvious clues to his whereabouts must be a trap, but with Mac's life on the line they have to try something. Flack says he was expecting this and brought along some insurance.

Meanwhile, Andy has Mac sitting motionless in a chair while he sets up a trap made of motion-detecting lasers, a shotgun, and a revolver. If Mac breaks the laser field, he will be shot by the revolver between the eyes. If someone opens the door to rescue him, they will be wounded with the shotgun. Andy had followed them the night of Will's death and saw what happened. 333 was the room that they were in, therefore this number was forever engraved upon his mind. Now living in NYC, Andy was content to let the past stay in the past until he saw the headlines praising Mac as a hero for taking down the Irish gang in "Snow Day". Jimmy is in NYC at Flack's insistence, and he calls Andy on Stella's phone. He tries to talk him out of his plan but Andy hears him on the other side of the wall. Jimmy starts to enter the room and Andy yells in an attempt to stop him. Jimmy is hit with a shotgun blast and knocked to the ground. Andy races over to his brother but as he passes in front of Mac's trap, Mac trips the lasers and Andy is shot in the gut (Andy is shot in the arm, as stated below). Mac jumps up and grabs the revolver while Andy draws a gun from his hip. Mac shoots him in the arm and the team runs in and subdues Andy. Stella assists Jimmy, who is revealed to be wearing a bulletproof vest. He is in pain and in shock, but not injured.

Flack approaches Mac and reminds him that in those situations they are trained to kill, not wound the victim's arm. "Not today", says Mac. "They've already lost enough, too much."

By the end of the fourth season, Mac is tricked and taken hostage by a criminal named "Joe". At the beginning of Season 5, he lost consciousness and after waking forgot what were the last things he did. He later revives his memories and is back on the case to find Joe. At the end of 5.01 "Veritas", he finally arrests Joe and tells him that he made him get very "pissed off".

In episode 5.10 The Triangle, Lindsay Monroe and Danny Messer inform Mac that they're having a baby. Instead of taking it badly, Mac embraces both of them with joy. When Lindsay finally gave birth to a baby girl, who she and Danny later named Lucy, Mac is asked to be her godfather. Mac instantly and delightfully accepts the offer.

Right before the end of the sixth season in "Point of View", Mac is injured from chasing a murderer. During his recovery, he sits on a chair in his apartment, which is positioned at his window, allowing him to spy on his neighbors (in a Rear Window-esque way). However, he witnesses a man visiting Mac's neighbor Kevin Scott, who is a former university professor. Hours later, the man is found dead. Later, Mac sees him poisoning his canary until he is interrupted by a visitor, unexpectedly to be Peyton, Mac's ex-girlfriend whom he hasn't seen for over three years since his visit to London with her. He tries to convince her that Kevin is behaving suspiciously and that he killed his canary, but she thinks he is jealous and tells him that Kevin is just her friend. They talk about the past and they rekindle their relationship. Mac tells her that he missed her after she left him for her family, to which she apologises, but he understood that her family is more important. Kevin's actions are proved to be criminal when he plotted to expose a group of people to a highly contagious chemical substance and he is arrested. Before the credits, Mac and Peyton look out of his apartment window amusingly, witnessing a couple kissing when a woman is about to catch them in the act.

Mac briefly left the NYPD and the Crime Lab following the events of episode 7.22 "Exit Strategy" in order to work for a private DNA Lab working to identify those who perished in the 9/11 attacks, partly to honor the memory of his wife, Claire.  However, his retirement papers are later "pulled" and he is reinstated to the lab as seen in episode 8.02 "Keep It Real".

In the eighth season finale, "Near Death", Mac is shot during a robbery gone wrong, he finds himself in limbo between life and death. As he fights for his life, the team struggles to keep their emotions in check as they process the evidence and bring the shooter to justice. The first and last "limbo" scenes feature Mac and Claire are great together. As with "Indelible", the pair has a comfortable, believable chemistry that makes Claire's death even more poignant. During her first scene this week, Claire explains to Mac that he's dying. He isn't ready, but she tells him it will all be okay. He wants to know why she is keeping her distance, so she comes closer and reaches out to touch him for the first time in more than a decade. Their second encounter at the end of the episode is very different. By then, Mac has come to terms with his situation and is ready to move on. Claire, however, tells him that he has to continue living. It isn't like him to give up. During the final scene with Mac and Claire, Mac confesses that he has met someone. He and Christine Whitney have embarked on a tentative relationship, and it's clear that he has been struggling with what this budding love might mean for his past with Claire. Claire gives Mac and Christine her blessing, which symbolizes Mac forgiving himself for falling in love again and allowing himself to move on. What he shared with Claire will always be an important part of him, but he deserves to find new happiness. In fact, Claire's final words to him are, "Be happy, Mac." While Mac deals with his internal struggles, Christine is waiting at the hospital to find out if Mac will live or die. Her brother Stan was Mac's former partner, who died in the line of duty, and she is once again forced to face the reality of what it can mean to have a police officer in the family. However, she doesn't run away. Instead, she stays at the hospital and waits, and she's with Mac when he wakes up at the end of the hour. She has been praying over him, and she sheds tears of joy when he squeezes her hand and opens his eyes. The relationship between Mac and Christine has been a nice addition to season eight, allowing fans to see Mac in a different light as he makes an effort to have a personal life away from the lab.

During the ninth season crossover with CSI: Crime Scene Investigation Christine plans to attend a restaurant convention in Las Vegas and Mac decides to surprise her there. In "In Vino Veritas", he meets up with D.B. Russell whom he'd met previously at a forensics convention. They find Christine's hotel room trashed and eventually discover she was kidnapped by her restaurant manager James Boyd before she left New York. Mac and D.B. return to New York to find her in episode 9.15 "Seth and Apep" and Mac goes a little over the line to rescue her.

In the ninth season finale, an innocent victim is mistakenly killed by a police officer during pursuit. This victim was about to propose to his girlfriend. Mac realizes that he should make of the most of his life. He asks Christine to marry him and she gladly agrees. However, it is never known if they marry due to the show's cancellation.

References

CSI: NY characters
Fictional New York City Police Department detectives
Fictional United States Marine Corps personnel
Fictional Gulf War veterans
Fictional characters from Chicago
Television characters introduced in 2004
Fictional forensic scientists
Crossover characters in television